is a 2005 Japanese film by Kenji Uchida, starring Yasuhi Nakamura, Reika Kirishima, Sō Yamanaka and Yuka Itaya

Plot
In one long Friday evening, Takeshi Miyata (Yasuhi Nakamura), a straight-arrow businessman, will encounter a number of people (some only fleetingly) who have intertwining fates. The plot of the film is presented in succession first from the point of view of Maki Kuwata (Reika Kirishima), a young woman disappointed in love, then from Takeshi's point of view, then of his friend, Yusuke Kanda (Sō Yamanaka), a private detective, then of Takeshi's former girlfriend, Ayumi Kurata (Yuka Itaya), then of a wannabe-tough Yakuza, Asai (Kisuke Yamashita).

Cast

 Yasuhi Nakamura as Takeshi Miyata
 Reika Kirishima as Maki Kuwata
 Sō Yamanaka as Yusuke Kanda
 Yuka Itaya as Ayumi Kurata
 Kisuke Yamashita as Asai

External links 
 

2005 films
2005 romantic comedy-drama films
2000s Japanese-language films
Japanese romantic comedy-drama films
Films directed by Kenji Uchida
2005 comedy films
2005 drama films
2000s Japanese films